Claudel is a surname. Notable people with the name include:

Aurélie Claudel (born 1980), French model
Camille Claudel (1864–1943), French sculptor and graphic artist
Henri Claudel (1871–1956), French general
Paul Claudel (1868–1955), French poet and diplomat
Philippe Claudel (born 1962), French writer and film director
Véronique Claudel (born 1966), French biathlete